Huangdian is a town of Zhongmu County in north-central Henan province, China, located  south of the county seat. , it has 32 villages under its administration.

See also 
 List of township-level divisions of Henan

References 

Township-level divisions of Henan
Zhongmu County